The Kerala Legislative Assembly election of 1965 was held to elect members to the third Niyamasabha. Communist Party of India (Marxist), which was the splinter faction of Communist Party of India, emerged as the largest party in the assembly with 40 seats, followed by Indian National Congress with 36. However no single party could form a ministry commanding majority and hence this election is considered abortive. On March 25, President's rule was invoked for the fourth time.

Background

Both the Indian National Congress and the Communist Party of India went through big changes during the period that preceded the elections in 1965. Congress was split and a new state party Kerala Congress was formed.

Communist Party of India also went through a split during this time, forming CPI(M).

Constituencies
There were 133 constituencies in total, out of which 120 were General Category, 11 Scheduled Castes, and 2 Scheduled Tribe seats.

Political parties

Three national parties - Indian National Congress, Communist Party of India and Communist Party of India (Marxist) and three state level parties Kerala Congress, Indian Union Muslim League and Samyukta Socialist Party took part in the elections.

Results

|- style="background-color:#E9E9E9; text-align:center;"
! class="unsortable" |
! Political Party !! Flag !! Seats  Contested !! Won !! Net Change  in seats !! % of  Seats
! Votes !! Vote % !! Change in vote % 
|- 
| 
| style="text-align:left;" |Indian National Congress
|  
| 133 || 36 ||  27 || 27.07 || 21,23,660 || 33.55 ||  0.87
|-
| 
| style="text-align:left;" |Communist Party of India
| 
| 79 || 3 ||  28 || 2.26 || 525,456 || 8.3 ||  30.84
|- 
| 
| style="text-align:left;" |Communist Party of India (Marxist)
| 
| 73 || 40 || New || 30.08 || 1,257,869 || 19.87 || New
|- 
| 
| style="text-align:left;" |Kerala Congress
|
| 54 || 23 || New || 17.29 || 796,291 || 12.58 || New
|-
| 
|
| 16 || 6 ||  ||  4.51 || 242,529 || 3.83 || 
|- 
| 
| style="text-align:left;" |Samyukta Socialist Party
|
| 29 || 13 || New || 9.77  || 514,689 || 8.13 || New
|-
| 
|
| 174 || 12 ||  7 || 9.02 || 869,843 || 13.74 || N/A
|- class="unsortable" style="background-color:#E9E9E9"
! colspan = 3|
! style="text-align:center;" |Total Seats !! 133 ( 0) !!  ||Voters !! 6,330,337 !! style="text-align:center;" |
|}

By Constituency

Government formation
No party or group was able to form a government due to the fractured nature of results. The result was the dissolution of the assembly again, and the state was again under President's Rule.

See also
 1960 Kerala Legislative Assembly election
 1967 Kerala Legislative Assembly election

References

1965
1965
Kerala